Taisuke  Okuno  (born March 1, 1977) is a Japanese professional mixed martial artist currently competing in the Middleweight division. A professional competitor since 2005, he has competed for World Victory Road, Pancrase, DEEP, and Shooto.

Shooto
At MMA debut in "Shooto – Shooter's Summer" Shooto event win Tsuneyoshi Kashimura.

DEEP
Loss to	Shigetoshi Iwase by unanimous decision at DEEP: 42 Impact, won Hidehiko Hasegawa by TKO at DEEP: 46 Impact.

Okuno fought Yuya Shirai for the Deep Welterweight Championship, he lost the fight via unanimous decision being controlled on the ground.

Sengoku
Took part on Sengoku Welterweight Grand Prix. Defeated Nick Thompson in quarter final of grand prix, at Sengoku Raiden Championships 14. Loss to Yasubey Enomoto at semi-final of grand prix at World Victory Road Presents: Sengoku Raiden Championships 15.

Mixed martial arts record

| Loss
| align=center| 13-12-2
| Tatsuya Mizuno
| Submission (rear-naked choke)
| DEEP: 82 Impact
| 
| align=center|3
| align=center|4:34
| Tokyo, Japan
|Middleweight bout.
|-
| Loss
| align=center| 13-11-2
| Ryuichiro Sumimura
| Decision (unanimous)
| DEEP: 78 Impact
| 
| align=center|3
| align=center|5:00
| Tokyo, Japan
|
|- 
| Win
| align=center| 13-10-2
| Ryuta Sakurai
| Decision (split)
| Deep: Cage Impact 2016
| 
| align=center| 3
| align=center| 5:00
| Tokyo, Japan
|Return to Welterweight.
|-
| Loss
| align=center| 12-10-2
| Takasuke Kume
| Decision (unanimous)
|  Pancrase 266
| 
| align=center|3
| align=center|5:00
| Tokyo, Japan
| 
|-
| Loss
| align=center| 12–9–2
| Akira Okada
| Technical Decision (split)
| Pancrase: 263
| 
| align=center|2
| align=center|0:32
| Tokyo, Japan
|
|- 
| Loss
| align=center| 12–8–2
| Yuta Watanabe
| TKO (corner stoppage)
| DEEP: 66 Impact
| 
| align=center| 3
| align=center| 0:26
| Tokyo, Japan
| 
|-
| Win
| align=center| 12–7–2
| Akihiro Gono
| KO (punch)
| DEEP: 62 Impact
| 
| align=center| 2
| align=center| 2:07
| Tokyo, Japan
| 
|-
| Loss
| align=center| 11–7–2
| Shigetoshi Iwase
| Decision (unanimous)
| DEEP: Cage Impact 2012: First Round
| 
| align=center| 3
| align=center| 5:00
| Tokyo, Japan
| 
|-
| Loss
| align=center| 11–6–2
| Yuya Shirai
| Decision (unanimous)
| DEEP / Smash: Japan MMA League 2011 Semifinals
| 
| align=center| 3
| align=center| 5:00
| Tokyo, Japan
| 
|-
| Win
| align=center| 11–5–2
| Ryo Chonan
| KO (punch)
| World Victory Road Presents: Soul of Fight
|  
| align=center| 1
| align=center| 0:19
| Tokyo, Japan
|Catchweight (80 kg) bout.
|-
| Loss
| align=center| 10–5–2
| Yasubey Enomoto
| Decision (unanimous)
| World Victory Road Presents: Sengoku Raiden Championships 15
|  
| align=center| 3
| align=center| 5:00
| Tokyo, Japan
| 
|-
| Win
| align=center| 10–4–2
| Nick Thompson
| KO (punch)  
| World Victory Road Presents: Sengoku Raiden Championships 14
| 
| align=center| 3
| align=center| 0:27
| Tokyo, Japan
| 
|-
| Win
| align=center| 9–4–2
| Hidehiko Hasegawa
| TKO (punches) 
| DEEP: 46 Impact
| 
| align=center| 1
| align=center| 4:09 
| Tokyo, Japan
| 
|-
| Win
| align=center| 8–4–2
| Masaki Konishi 
| TKO (punches) 
| Shooto: Alternative 1
|  
| align=center| 1
| align=center| 0:47 
| Osaka, Japan
| 
|-
| Draw
| align=center| 7–4–2
| Takasuke Kume 
| Draw 
| Shooto: Gig Central 18
| 
| align=center| 2
| align=center| 5:00
| Nagoya, Aichi, Japan
| 
|-
| Loss
| align=center| 7–4–1
| Shigetoshi Iwase 
| Decision (unanimous) 
| DEEP: 42 Impact 
|  
| align=center| 2
| align=center| 5:00
| Tokyo, Japan
| 
|-
| Loss
| align=center| 7–3–1
| Takuya Sato 
| Decision (unanimous) 
| Shooto: Shooting Disco 7: Young Man
|  
| align=center| 2
| align=center| 5:00 
| Tokyo, Japan
| 
|-
| Win
| align=center| 7–2–1
| Daisuke Okumiya
| Decision (unanimous) 
| Shooto: Shooto Tradition 4
|  
| align=center| 2
| align=center| 5:00 
| Tokyo, Japan
| 
|-
| Win
| align=center| 6–2–1
| Yoichiro Sato 
| Decision (unanimous) 
| Shooto: Shooting Disco 6: Glory Shines In You
|  
| align=center| 2
| align=center| 5:00 
| Tokyo, Japan
| 
|-
| Win
| align=center| 5–2–1
| Masayoshi Ichikawa 
| KO (punch) 
| GCM: Demolition 080721 
|  
| align=center| 1
| align=center| 0:26
| Japan
| 
|-
| Loss
| align=center| 4–2–1
| Yoshitaro Niimi 
| Decision (split) 
| Shooto: Shooting Disco 5: Earth, Wind and Fighter
|  
| align=center| 2
| align=center| 5:00
| Tokyo, Japan
| 
|-
| Draw
| align=center| 4–1–1
| Xavier Lucas
| Draw 
| Shooto: Gig Central 14
|  
| align=center| 2
| align=center| 5:00
| Perth, Australia
| 
|-
| Win
| align=center| 4–1
| Hirosumi Sugiura 
| TKO (doctor stoppage) 
| Shooto: Rookie Tournament 2007 Final
|  
| align=center| 1
| align=center| 4:42 
| Tokyo, Japan
| 
|-
| Loss
| align=center| 3–1
| Masaki Konishi 
| Decision (unanimous) 
| Shooto: Rookie Tournament Final
| 
| align=center| 2
| align=center| 5:00
| Tokyo, Japan
| 
|-
| Win
| align=center| 3–0
| Mateus Irie Nechio
| TKO (punches) 
| Shooto: Shooting Star
|  
| align=center| 2
| align=center| 1:01 
| Setagaya, Tokyo, Japan
| 
|-
| Win
| align=center| 2–0
| Hidekazu Asakura 
| TKO (punches) 
| Shooto: 3/3 in Kitazawa Town Hall
|   
| align=center| 2
| align=center| 3:20  
| Setagaya, Tokyo, Japan
| 
|-
| Win
| align=center| 1–0
| Tsuneyoshi Kashimura 
| TKO (punches) 
| Shooto: Shooter's Summer
|  
| align=center| 2
| align=center| 2:40  
| Setagaya, Tokyo, Japan
|

References

External links
 

1977 births
Japanese male mixed martial artists
Welterweight mixed martial artists
Mixed martial artists utilizing karate
Mixed martial artists utilizing boxing
Mixed martial artists utilizing Muay Thai
Japanese male karateka
Japanese Muay Thai practitioners
Living people